My Cactus Heart (stylized as #MyCactusHeart) is a 2012 Filipino romantic comedy film directed by Enrico Santos, starring Maja Salvador, Matteo Guidicelli, and introducing Xian Lim.

It is the first independent film produced by Skylight Films which premiered inside the PBB house on January 24. 2012. It was released nationwide on January 25, 2012.

Premise 
Sandy (Maja Salvador) is a hopeless romantic who has dumped many boyfriends and also rejected a number of suitors. Her life changes when she meets Bene (Xian Lim), a handsome heartthrob, at work. However, her friend Carlo (Matteo Guidicelli) will do everything to have her reciprocate his affection.

Plot 
My Cactus heart, A thorny love story revolves on Sandy (Maja Salvador), a hopeless romantic girl whose heart and mind is very optimistic believing there is only one great perfect love. After discovering the infidelity of her father, she sworn off love, she thinks men are heels. Now she is known as heart breaker, 'BASTED-ERA' - that's Sandy who always find reasons to reject men who hangs around her. She feels she will end up being hurt, just what like her father did to her mother. She has dumped every man she has been in a relationship with, ignored and denied suitors who would love to ask her out. Now, who might be the lucky guy to enter her thorny heart? Will it be her friend Carlo (Matteo Guidicelli), a waiter of a family business, who is repeatedly rejected by Sandy, but doesn't take NO for an answer, or her handsome new co-worker Benedict (Xian Lim)?

Cast

Main cast
Maja Salvador as Sandra 'Sandy'
Matteo Guidicelli as Carlo
Xian Lim as Benedict

Supporting cast
Ramon Christopher as Facundo
Rosanna Roces as Margaret
Ricky Davao as Dan
Joy Viado† as Tita Au
Pinky Amador as Carol
Bettina Carlos as Anna
Kristel Moreno as Lucy
Franzen Fajardo as Tommy
Beatriz Saw as Arianna
Lemuel Pelayo as Kale
Mariel Pamintuan as Heart
Niña Dolino as Helena
Gee Canlas as Johanna
Ervic Vijandre as Romeo
JM de Guzman as Valentin
Cecil Paz as Lindsay

Box office
#MyCactusHeart had a total gross receipts of P23,008,393, as of its third week. It ranked 4th Top Grossing Indie Film of 2012 and one of the 20 Top Grossing Filipino films of 2012.

It is one of the most successful indie films of 2012 beating other mainstream films of GMA Films, Viva Films, and Regal Films.

Soundtrack
Star Records released the soundtrack of the movie, containing 12 tracks. Sam Milby made a cover of "Kaba", which was originally sung by Tootsie Guevarra for the film's soundtrack album, however, in the official music video, it was sung by Matteo Guidicelli.

References

External links

2012 films
2010s Tagalog-language films
2010s English-language films
Star Cinema films
Skylight Films films
Philippine romance films
2012 romance films
2012 multilingual films
Philippine multilingual films